Rabot Point is a high rocky point on the east side of James Ross Island, Antarctica. It lies in Markham Bay and separates the mouths of Gourdon and Hobbs Glaciers.

Origin of the name
A small glacier close west of The Watchtower on the south side of the island was originally named 'Rabot Gletscher', after the French glaciologist Charles Rabot, by Otto Nordenskjold, leader of the Swedish Antarctic Expedition 1901–04. However, the Falkland Islands Dependencies Survey surveyed the south part of the island in 1953 and found the glacier to be very insignificant and does not require a name. In order to preserve the name Rabot in the vicinity, the United Kingdom Antarctic Place-Names Committee decided to apply it to 'Rabot Point' instead.

Headlands of James Ross Island